Inazuma Eleven is a role-playing sports video game for the Nintendo DS developed and published by Level-5. It was released in Japan in August 2008, and was localized in English in 2011. A Nintendo 3DS port was released in the Western world on February 13, 2014, as a downloadable game via the Nintendo eShop, including updated graphics and visuals, and is the first and only game in the series available in North America.  The game was also included in an compilation for the Nintendo 3DS, Inazuma Eleven 1-2-3: Endou Mamoru's Legend, which released in Japan in December 2012.

The game has spawned a franchise, with numerous sequels and other media. An Inazuma Eleven manga based on the games began serialization in CoroCoro Comic in May 2008, while an anime based on the games aired in October 2008. Mitsui has also created a collectible card game tie-in.

Plot
The main character, is a very talented goalkeeper and the grandson of the late , one of the strongest goalkeepers in Japan and coach of the legendary football team, the Inazuma Eleven (though Endou is unaware of this). He is captain of his school's (Raimon Jr. High) football team, and dreams of competing in the Football Frontier tournament one day. The club is on the verge of disbanding, as the other members seem uninterested in training.

One day, a mysterious forward named  moves to Endou's school. Gouenji used to be the top striker at his old school, and has gained the attention of Teikoku Academy (led by team captain Yuto Kidou and principal Reiji Kageyama), the most prestigious school in the area. They come to Raimon and challenge them to a football match, despite Gouenji refusing to join Raimon's team. They are much more powerful than anticipated, and Raimon's out-of-practice players take a horrible beating. Gouenji decides to join the team to help them out, and his sudden appearance surprises Teikoku, which he uses as an opportunity to score a goal. As the first goal scored against Teikoku Academy in years, Kidou counts it as a win for Raimon and leaves with his team.

The victory gets Raimon a lot of attention, allowing them access into the Football Frontier tournament, which they gladly accept. They prove themselves as a force-to-be reckoned-with, winning all of their matches and reaching the finals. Before the match, Kageyama uses the team's coach to spy on them, and orders him to kill them by draining the brake fluid from their bus. His plan is foiled by Natsumi Raimon the school counsellor's daughter, who promptly gets the teacher fired. At the match, Kageyama tries to kill them again by crushing them with girders. They survive thanks to a warning from Kidou, and Kageyama is promptly arrested by Detective Onigawara. The match goes on, and after a long battle, Raimon emerges victorious.

The team then move onto the Football Frontier nationals, but learn they will be unable to compete without a coach. Detective Onigawara points Endou in the direction of a man named Seigou Hibiki, who used to be part of Raimon's team from forty years ago, the Inazuma Eleven. He explains that the team was coached by Endou's grandfather Daisuke, and that they were an unstoppable soccer team. This excites Endou, until Hibiki tells him about how their run was ended when their bus crashed on the way to their last Football Frontier match, injuring the players and preventing them from competing.

Despite his past, Hibiki agrees to be the team's coach, and also gets the team training with the now-elderly members of the Inazuma Eleven. This training helps them win their next few matches, along with the assistance of Kidou, who joins them after Teikoku is crushed by Zeus Junior High, who, unbeknownst to them, is being led by Kageyama. Zeus also continue to win all their games, each time leaving their opponents unable to continue. This means the final will be Raimon versus Zeus.

When Raimon arrive at the stadium for the finals (which is a floating palace in the sky), they see the members of Zeus drinking a so-called 'ambrosia', which turns out to be filled with drugs to improve their abilities. The first half begins, and Zeus begin winning instantly thanks to the ambrosia; benching most of the players and scoring goal after goal. As the first half ends, Natsumi realises that the drinks are spiked, and goes to switch the drinks with regular water. Her plan succeeds, and Zeus are forced to play through the remainder of the game as a normal team, allowing Raimon to seize victory and win the Football Frontier.

Cast 

 Lau Man Wai
 Tsang Hoi Tung
 Xi Xin Yue
 Ruan Xin You 
 Hong Man Xia
 Lu Song Yan
 Ye Yong Yu
 Kelly Yao
 Lam Ka Yan
 Lu Bai Feng
 Chen Chuo Yan
 Yao Xin Tong
 Chen Xin Yi
 Gigi Chiu
 Guo Shao Yao
 Zhu Wan Qian
 Sheza Azhar
 Amama Hussain
 Zhou Zhuo Lin
 Li Xin Yue
 Liu Hui Xin
 Ji Yue
 Chen Jie Chi

Gameplay
By talking to Otonashi inside the team's clubroom, players can scout out other members of the school they want to add to their team, either by name/criteria, or by a 'connection map', which grows bigger the more players obtained from it. They can then locate them on the overworld and challenge them to a battle, which, if won, adds them to their party. Also, by talking to Natsumi in  the clubroom, players can recruit people from the various teams they have beaten in the main story. There are nearly 1000 playable characters to collect, each with their own unique design, stats and abilities, but only 100 can be contained in a player's party at once.

The other part of the game is the football matches themselves. Players control their team with the stylus, moving players and passing between teammates. Running into an opponent initiates a command duel, where the player can do things like dodge an opponent's attempt at a tackle, slide-tackle to take the ball away, or attempt to score a goal. The result of any of their players' actions in a duel are determined by their form, which is decided by their stats (Kick, Body, Control, Guard, Speed, Stamina, and Guts), the player's element (either Wood, Air, Earth or Fire, which work in a 'rock-paper-scissors'-like fashion), and the total number of players participating in an action.

Matches either take the form of the aforementioned 4-a-side kickabouts against members of the school, or a full-scale 11-a-side game against one of the other teams competing in the tournaments. In full-size games, players can have up to five substitutes ready to switch in during a time-out. Before a match begins, players can change their team's formation using cards they've obtained by beating other teams and looking in chests.  Winning matches grants teams experience points (which level up their players), prestige points (which are used to buy items in shops and to recover FP and TP), and friendship points (which are spent when scouting and recruiting new players), as well as recovery items, equipment, and formation cards.

Instead of making standard movements in duels like dodging or shooting, players can also use special abilities to learn either by leveling up or using an unusual move manually. They are typically more powerful and effective than their regular counterparts and can typically only be stopped by other moves, but cost TP (Technical Points) to use. These abilities include summoning a dragon to shoot the ball or creating a giant hand of energy to save a shot. Special moves also have elements, which give them a boost when used by a player of the same element.

Sometimes, the victor of a duel can receive a foul, resulting in a free kick (or penalty). Other mid-match abilities include: time-outs, where the player can pause the match to plan movements or switch in subs and then initiate them after un-pausing; charges, where the player taps on a team-member rapidly to give them a speed boost (at the cost of Fitness Points, or FP); and firing-up, which boosts a team's overall performance.

Reception

The game received generally favorable reviews according to review aggregator Metacritic. The Japanese magazine Famitsu gave the game a total score of 36 out of 40, with two reviewers giving it a 9 out of 10, one giving it a full 10, and another giving it an 8. The Dutch reviewer Gamer.nl gave the game a score of 8 out of 10, while the Spanish reviewers 3D Juegos, Vandal Online and VicioJuegos gave it scores of 8.0 out of 10, 8.2 out of 10, and 83 out of 100, respectively. Official Nintendo Magazine dedicated a six-page spread to Inazuma Eleven and showcased the game on their front cover, awarding an 89% score.

Fragland gave the game a score of 84%, praising its "original combat system, beautiful and cute graphics, good sound and a very tight and deep gameplay and finishing." Nintendo Life gave it 8 stars out of 10, concluding that it is a "refreshing take on" the RPG genre and that "the compelling storyline, overall charm and well-structured fantasy style football system" will create "an experience that RPG lovers will come to cherish."

It was the first best-selling game in Japan the week of its release at 41,000 copies. The game sold 29,000 copies in its second week and 14,000 copies in its third week.

References

External links
Official site

2008 video games
Association football video games
Inazuma Eleven video games
Level-5 (company) games
Nintendo DS games
Nintendo 3DS games
Nintendo 3DS eShop games
Nintendo games
Role-playing video games
Nintendo Wi-Fi Connection games
Video games developed in Japan
Video games scored by Yasunori Mitsuda